Tadeusz Kraus (also known as Tadeáš Kraus) (22 October 1932 – 30 October 2018) was a Czechoslovak international footballer of Polish ethnicity who represented Czechoslovakia.

He was born in Třinec. His father Wilhelm was a metallurgist worker in Třinec Iron and Steel Works and also a footballer and activist in Siła Trzyniec, local Polish sport club. Wife of Tadeusz Kraus, Anna, was a skilled gymnast who finished fourth at the 1956 Olympic Games.

He was raised in football by the Siła Trzyniec. In 1951 he left the club and went to the university in Prague. He played for several clubs and from 1955 played for Dukla Prague. Another year Kraus joined Sparta Prague where he played for another 10 years, 4 years was a team captain. He then played for several other minor clubs and in 1971 started coaching. In the 1970s and 1980s coached Cypriot club Aris Limassol for six years.

Kraus played for Czechoslovakia national team (scoring 6 goals in 23 matches) and was a participant at the two World Cups, 1954 FIFA World Cup and 1958 FIFA World Cup.

Kraus was the last surviving member of Czechoslovakia's 1954 World Cup squad.

References

External links
 ČMFS profile 

1932 births
2018 deaths
Sportspeople from Třinec
Polish people from Zaolzie
Czechoslovak footballers
Czechoslovakia international footballers
Czech footballers
1954 FIFA World Cup players
1958 FIFA World Cup players
Dukla Prague footballers
AC Sparta Prague players
FK Jablonec players
Czechoslovak football managers
AC Sparta Prague managers
Czechoslovak expatriate sportspeople in Cyprus
Expatriate football managers in Cyprus
Aris Limassol FC managers
Association football forwards
Křídla vlasti Olomouc players
FK Jablonec managers
Czech expatriate football managers